The coat of arms of the city of Gdańsk (German: Wappen Danzigs), in its current form, dates back to 1410 and Banderia Prutenorum. The coat of arms is very similar to the flag of Gdańsk. It depicts two silver crosses on a red shield above each other, above which hovers a golden crown. The greater arms also has two lions as supporters and Gdańsk motto. 

The coat of arms in its current form (two crosses and a crown) was given by Casimir IV Jagiellon on May 25, 1457. Officially adopted in 2010.

History
Coat of arms of Gdańsk was also used by several noble families of Russia, including Counts Sheremetevs, Lodygins, and Konovnitsyns. In case of the Sheremetev and Konovnitsyn coat of arms, it refers to the legendary origin of the family from the leader of one of the Prussian tribes. A similar design is used by Oliwa.

Republic of Danzig used same symbols. Between the world wars, the Free City of Danzig adopted its arms, defined in the Constitution (Die Verfassung der Freien Stadt Danzig vom 17. November 1920). Both pattée (tatzenkreuz) and common crosses (gemeines Kreuz) were used.

See also
 Danzig Cross
 Banderia Prutenorum

References

Sources
 Banderia Prutenorum oder die Fahnen des Deutschen Ordens und seiner Verbündeten, welche in Schlachten und Gefechten des 15. Jahrhunderts eine Beute der Polen wurden / Abb. F.A. Vossberg. — Berlin, 1849.

External links

Gdańsk
History of Gdańsk
Gdańsk
Gdańsk
Gdańsk
Free City of Danzig

Gdansk